Imaginary Diseases is an album of material by Frank Zappa from the Petit Wazoo tour of 1972. It is one of two finished CD projects from the tour containing material mastered by Zappa before his death. The name of the album is derived from a lyric in the Apostrophe (') (1974) song "Stink-Foot".

Track listing 
All tracks written, composed and arranged by Frank Zappa.

Personnel 
 Frank Zappa – conductor, guitar, vocals
 Earl Dumler – woodwinds
 Tom Malone – saxes, piccolo trumpet, trumpet, tuba
 Malcolm McNab – trumpet
 Gary Barone – trumpet, flugelhorn
 Glenn Ferris – trombone
 Bruce Fowler – trombone
 Tony Duran – slide guitar
 Dave Parlato – bass
 Jim Gordon – drums

Composed/Produced/Performed/Edited/Mixed/Tweaked by Frank Zappa

Vaultmeistered by Joe Travers. Mastered by Doug Sax & Robert Hadley

Liner notes by Steve Vai.

References

External links 
 Imaginary Diseases at Zappa.com

Live albums published posthumously
Frank Zappa live albums
2006 live albums
Zappa Records albums